The 2021–22 Alaska Nanooks men's ice hockey season was the 72nd season of play for the program and the 37th at the Division I level. The Nanooks represented the University of Alaska Fairbanks and were coached by Erik Largen in his 3rd season.

Season
After the decision to cancel their previous season due to the COVID-19 pandemic, Alaska returned to the ice for the first time in 40 years without their long-time rival, Alaska Anchorage. The loss of their most consistent opponent could not have come at a worse time as the Nanooks also found themselves without a conference for the first time since the mid-1990s. The only advantage that Alaska had was that the NCAA still did not count games against schools from Alaska towards a team's limit of games per year. This allowed the Nanooks to insert themselves into the schedule of their opponents on short notice.

Alaska was rather ambitious with its early-season slate, playing their first 12 games against teams that were ranked for most or all of the season. As a result the Nanooks, who were still trying to build team chemistry, began the year with a terrible 1–12 record. It wasn't until December that the players started to work together consistently, but the early season struggles forged the Nanooks into a unified group.

After winning three consecutive games against Rensselaer, Alaska tied Denver and then defeated Minnesota, both of whom finished the season as top-5 teams. The Nanooks even managed to sweep Arizona State, who had NCAA tournament aspirations, in the midst of a 5-game winning streak. After December 10, Alaska finished their season 12–6–2 and demonstrated a tremendous improvement throughout the year.

Departures

Recruiting

Roster
As of September 23, 2021.

Standings

Schedule and results

|-
!colspan=12 style=";" | Regular Season

Scoring statistics

Goaltending statistics

Rankings

Note: USCHO did not release a poll in week 24.

References

2021-22
Alaska
Alaska
Alaska
Alaska